Kore & Skalp are two DJs and producers who have worked together since 1997. Among others, they have made mixtapes, concerts and Scratch performances. And they have produced music for many underground groups, e.g. Eloquence, Costello and la Scred Connexion. Since 2001, Kore & Skalp have been at Sony Music France. They separated in 2006 after 5 years together.

Career 

Kore (real name Djamel Fezari) & Skalp (real name Pascal Boniani Koeu) have mixed tracks by a great number of French artists. They produced the album La Vie Avant la Mort (Life Before Death) by French rapper Rohff, and they have taken part in producing songs for albums by Booba, Don Choa, Willy Denzey, Leslie and all of the comedy DVDs by Jamel Debbouze. They have made the music to the movie Taxi 3 along with DJ Mehdi and The Neptunes.

In 2003, the duo decided to go their own way. Artop Records offered them independence so they could develop their own projects and help some artists in the beginning of their new career like the R'n'B singer Amine.

In 2004 the team produced Booba and Leslie's albums, and toured with them as DJs. At the same time the duo made their first album named Raï'n'B Fever which mixed R'n'B and Raï. The album came out in France in June 2004, and went gold with over 75,000 sold copies. The single "Un Gaou à Oran", with 113, the Algerian raï star Mohammed Lamine and Magic System was a big hit in France during the summer and autumn 2004. On the album, French R'n'B artists such as Corneille, Willy Denzey and Leslie appeared. Also great raï names Khaled, Faudel, Amine and several French rap stars like Rohff and 113 were included on the album.

In summer 2006 Raï'n'B Fever 2 was released, and stars like Amerie, Kelly Rowland, Amine, M. Pokora, Leslie and Sniper could be found on the CD.

Discography

Singles

Albums

References

External links 
 http://www.skyrock.com/musique/Artistes/?85+Kore-skalp+bio (In French)

French DJs
French hip hop record producers